AF1 or AF-1 may refer to:

 Air Force One, the air traffic callsign for the plane (if operated by the Air Force) that the President of the United States is aboard
 Arena Football League, a new Arena football league in the US that was originally planned to be named Arena Football 1
 , the lead ship of her class of stores ships for the US Navy
 Air Force 1 (shoe), a shoe produced by Nike, Inc.
 Methyl fluoroacetate

See also
 Air Force One (disambiguation)
 First Air Force (1 AF), USAF numbered air force